Sobolevsky (masculine), Sobolevskaya (feminine), or Sobolevskoye (neuter), is a Polish and Belarusian family name related to the word "". It is shared by the following people:
Pyotr Sobolevsky (1904–1977), Soviet actor

It may also refer to:
Sobolevsky District, a district of Kamchatka Krai, Russia
Sobolevsky (rural locality) (Sobolevskaya, Sobolevskoye), name of several rural localities in Russia

See also
Sobolewski
Sobol (disambiguation)
Soból, a village in Poland
Sobolew (disambiguation)
Sobolevo, several rural localities in Russia
Sobel (disambiguation)
Sobolev

Russian-language surnames
Jewish surnames
Patronymic surnames
Surnames of Polish origin
Surnames of Ukrainian origin
Surnames of Russian origin